Ernie Haase & Signature Sound is an American Southern Gospel quartet founded in 2002 by Ernie Haase, former Cathedral Quartet tenor and Garry Jones, former Gold City pianist. As of November 2021, the group consists of Dustin Doyle (lead/baritone), Doug Anderson (lead/baritone), Paul Harkey (bass) and Ernie Haase (tenor). The group has released 32 albums and 16 DVDs, many of which feature other Christian and Gospel artists.

History

Origin 
The Cathedral Quartet announced their farewell tour in 1999. Lead singer Glen Payne died on October 15, 1999, before the end of the tour. Upon request of Glen Payne, the remaining members finished the tour with pianist Roger Bennett performing Payne's vocals. Following the tour Bennett and baritone Scott Fowler formed Legacy Five while Ernie Haase continued his solo career.

Subsequently, former Cathedrals bass George Younce and Jake Hess, along with Bill Gaither formed The Old Friends Quartet with Ernie Haase, Wesley Pritchard, and Garry Jones. The Old Friends Quartet disbanded after about two years on the road, however, as Hess and Younce's ill health prevented them from doing much traveling. Ernie Haase, along with Jones, continued quartet singing and wished to create a quartet with a modern image and attitude, but traditional in sound. Haase and Jones, together with lead singer Shane Dunlap, baritone Doug Anderson, and bass singer Tim Duncan formed the Signature Sound Quartet. They recorded three albums, Stand by Me released in April 2002, followed by Building a Bridge and Glory To His Name in 2003. They participated in their first live concert (Live in Indiana) at Reardon Auditorium, in Anderson, Indiana, on February 21, 2003.

2003–04 
Later Shane Dunlap left Signature Sound to start a solo career after release of their third album Glory to His Name in 2003. Wesley Pritchard took Dunlap's position while the group searched for a full-time lead. Jones and Haase dissolved their business relationship after the first year and Roy Webb was chosen as pianist. Later, they found Ryan Seaton (formerly of The Melody Boys Quartet) and hired him as the new lead singer. Haase's father-in-law George Younce became co-owner of the quartet and helped the group have an affiliation with the Gaither Music Group. They released their fourth album, The Ground is Level, followed by Great Love in 2004.

Name change 
In 2004, the group changed its name to Ernie Haase and Signature Sound, reportedly in order to avoid confusion with other similarly titled regional groups. They released their self-titled album in October 2005. They signed with the Gaither Music Group and became regular performers with the Gaither Homecoming tours and videos. In May 2007, pianist Roy Webb left the band to be with his father, who was dying of cancer. On May 29, 2007, it was announced that Webb had resigned from the group. Later, it was announced that Gordon Mote would be the group's piano player during their Get Away Jordan summer tour supporting their album Get Away, Jordan released in January 2007. Singer and producer Bill Gaither eventually began scheduling a second series of concerts with only Signature Sound and the Gaither Vocal Band appearing together. Due in part to the popularity of these concerts, the two groups decided to record a single album together, entitled Together, which debuted in October 2007. On the DVD, it was hinted that future collaborations between Signature Sound and the Vocal Band were upcoming. Producer and songwriter Wayne Haun has served as their pianist since their 2008 Summer tour. The group's next project was entitled, Dream On. This was released in late October 2008 and was filmed in Chicago, at the Navy Pier Ballroom. In October 2009 a new Christmas album, the group's second such album, was released entitled Every Light That Shines at Christmas.

The Cathedrals Tributes 

In September 2009, following a three-year hiatus from the National Quartet Convention, Haase and Signature Sound returned to performing there along with the rest of the Gaither Homecoming performers. Haase was unable to appear with former Cathedrals members Scott Fowler, Gerald Wolfe, Mark Trammell, and Danny Funderburk for a NQC special showcase presentation called The Cathedrals Remembered, a tribute concert at the convention in which the former Cathedral members joined forces to sing many old Cathedral songs and to honor George Younce and Glen Payne. Haase had other engagements over the weekend and had to leave NQC early, prior to the taping. In January 2009, Ernie Haase announced a Cathedrals tribute tour was next on the quartet's agenda and the group started touring with a live band that included Wayne Haun on the piano, David Griffith on the bass, Kelly Vaughan on electric guitar and Zak Shumate on the drums. On December 28, 2009, Ernie announced that Ryan Seaton was leaving the quartet to pursue other interests and that former Karen Peck and New River lead/tenor Devin McGlamery would be joining as the new lead singer, and they released A Tribute to the Cathedral Quartet in October 2010.

2011–15 
On January 18, 2011, it was announced that bass singer Tim Duncan had left, and Ian Owens had joined the group as the new bass singer for the group. The group released a new project called "Here We Are Again" in February 2012. In October 2012, Ian Owens announced his resignation and later joined Soul'd Out Quartet, and Paul Harkey joined as the new bass singer. In April 2015, Doug Anderson announced in a video with Haase that he will be stepping down from his position in Signature Sound to pursue a full-time solo career. Anderson had been with the group as its baritone singer since its inception in 2002, a total of 13 years. It was later announced that Dustin Doyle of Beyond The Ashes will be replacing Anderson in the Baritone part.

2020–present 
In June 2020, Haase had suspended their touring schedule due to the COVID-19 pandemic. Later they created the Living Room Sing to which they sang songs from their Something Beautiful album. On September 11, they renamed it to Friday Night Sing, a series of 16 episodes of stories and songs which featured many special guests. It premiered every Friday night from September 11 to December 25, 2020. In March 2021, Haase announced that on March 12 they will continue their touring schedule. The group then released Keeping On on July 23, 2021.  The album was the final project to feature Devin McGlamery as it was announced on September 14, 2021, that he would be leaving the group at the end of October and Doug Anderson would be rejoining the group in November 2021. In 2022, the group crossed genres and recorded a traditional pop album called Decades of Love, an album of standard pop love songs that were covered by the group spanning nearly 10 decades. The album was released on August 5, 2022. The project originally was dedicated to the wives of the group's members, but became a successful album by being a top 10 pop music release on iTunes the week it was released. The group continues to be one of the top acts in the Gospel and Christian music field.

Members (past and present)

Line-ups

Musicians 

 Piano 
 Garry Jones (2002–2003)
 Roy Webb (2003–2007)
 Gordon Mote (2007)
 Wayne Haun (2008–2015)
 Tyler Vestal (2015–present)

 Bass Guitar
 David Griffith (2009–present)

 Drums 
 Greg Ritchie (2009)
 Zak Shumate (2010–2013)

 Guitar
 Kelly Vaughn (2010–2012)

Cathedrals Family Reunion members

Line-ups

Discography 
 2002: Stand by Me 
 2003: Building a Bridge – Great Quartet Songs of the Last Century Vol.I 
 2003: Glory to His Name – Great Quartet Songs of the Last Century Vol.II 
 2004: The Ground Is Level – Great Quartet Songs of the Last Century Vol.III 
 2004: Great Love 
 2004: Stand by Me – Live 
 2004: Christmas with Ernie Haase & Signature Sound 
 2005: Ernie Haase & Signature Sound 
 2007: Get Away, Jordan 
 2007: Together – Recorded with the Gaither Vocal Band
 2008: Influenced: A Vintage Quartet Session 
 2008: Dream On – Grammy Award nomination
 2009: Every Light That Shines at Christmas 
 2010: Influenced: Spirituals & Southern Classics 
 2010: A Tribute to the Cathedral Quartet 
 2011: George Younce with Ernie Haase & Signature Sound 
 2011: A White Christmas 
 2012: California Live – Vol.1 
 2012: California Live – Vol.2
 2012: Here We Are Again 
 2013: Glorious Day 
 2013: Christmas Live! 
 2014: Oh, What a Savior 
 2015: The Inspiration of Broadway
 2015: Happy People 
 2016: The Favorite Hymns of Fanny Crosby 
 2018: Clear Skies 
 2019: A Jazzy Little Christmas 
 2020: Something Beautiful: Our Favorite Songs of Bill & Gloria Gaither 
 2020: Brotherhood - Recorded with the Booth Brothers
 2021: Keeping On
 2022: Decades of Love

Video

Appearances on other DVDs 
2005: Give It Away, Gaither Vocal Band; "Glory, Glory Clear The Road", "Heavenly Parade" and "Give It Away"

Homecoming video performances 
         Bill Gaither video  “Ten Thousand Years (You Tube)
2005: Israel Homecoming "Holy Highway", "This Could Be The Dawning Of That Day/Until Then" and "River Of Jordan"
2005: Jerusalem Homecoming "He Is Jehovah"
2006: Canadian Homecoming  "Stand By Me", "Holy Highway" and "Then Came The Morning"
2006: Live From Toronto  "Glory To God In The Highest" and "This Could Be The Dawning Of That Day/Until Then"
2006: Homecoming Christmas "Tonight", "Forgiven Again" and "Give It Away" (with Gaither Vocal Band)
2007: Amazing Grace  "I Then Shall Live" (with Gaither Vocal Band)
2007: South African Homecoming  "Stand By Me" and "Oh, What A Savior"
2007: Love Can Turn The World  "Trying To Get A Glimpse"
2008: Country Bluegrass Homecoming Vol. 1 "Reason Enough"
2008: Country Bluegrass Homecoming Vol. 2 "Climbing Up The Mountain"
2009: Joy in My Heart "Someday"
2017: Sweeter As The Days Go By "I Do Believe"

Awards

GMA Dove Awards

Grammy Awards

References

External links 
Ernie Haase & Signature Sound Official Website
http://ssqfan.com/ Ernie Haase & Signature Sound fan site

2002 establishments in the United States
American Christian musical groups
Gospel quartets
Musical groups established in 2002
Musical groups from Ohio
Southern gospel performers